The 2006–07 New York Knicks season was the 61st season for the team in the National Basketball Association (NBA). During the off-season, the Knicks hired general manager Isiah Thomas as head coach. The team finished with a 33–49 record, which placed them fourth in the Atlantic Division. For the third consecutive season, New York did not make the NBA Playoffs. Eddy Curry led the team with 19.5 points per game, while Jamal Crawford averaged 17.6 points per game, and Stephon Marbury provided them with 16.4 points and 5.4 assists per game. Second-year forward David Lee played a sixth man role off the bench, averaging 10.7 points and leading the team with 10.4 rebounds per game. Following the season, Steve Francis signed as a free agent with his former team, the Houston Rockets.

Draft picks

Roster

Regular season

Season standings

Record vs. opponents

Player statistics

Regular season 

|-
| 
| 68 || 1 || 15.6 || .505 || .185 || .567 || 4.3 || .6 || .8 || style=";"| .6 || 4.9
|-
| 
| 18 || 0 || 5.3 || .318 || . || .667 || 1.7 || .0 || .2 || style=";"| .6 || 1.2
|-
| 
| 52 || 9 || 14.9 || .382 || .277 || .585 || 2.0 || 1.6 || .6 || .1 || 4.5
|-
| 
| 59 || 36 || style=";"| 37.3 || .400 || .320 || style=";"| .838 || 3.2 || 4.4 || style=";"| 1.0 || .1 || 17.6
|-
| 
| style=";"| 81 || style=";"| 81 || 35.2 || .576 || style=";"| 1.000 || .615 || 7.0 || .8 || .4 || .5 || style=";"| 19.5
|-
| 
| 44 || 30 || 28.1 || .408 || .378 || .829 || 3.6 || 3.9 || .9 || .3 || 11.3
|-
| 
| 72 || 59 || 26.3 || .433 || .167 || .787 || 5.5 || .9 || .5 || style=";"| .6 || 9.5
|-
| 
| 41 || 11 || 6.7 || .418 || . || .556 || 1.6 || .1 || .1 || .4 || 1.9
|-
| 
| 55 || 43 || 23.8 || .461 || .100 || .456 || 4.3 || 1.2 || .8 || .5 || 4.1
|-
| 
| 55 || 43 || 29.8 || style=";"| .600 || . || .815 || style=";"| 10.4 || 1.8 || .8 || .4 || 10.7
|-
| 
| 74 || 74 || 37.1 || .415 || .357 || .769 || 2.9 || style=";"| 5.4 || style=";"| 1.0 || .1 || 16.4
|-
| 
| 5 || 0 || 8.8 || .167 || . || .333 || 1.8 || .2 || .4 || .2 || .8
|-
| 
| 49 || 47 || 33.1 || .418 || .376 || .692 || 7.2 || 2.2 || .7 || .1 || 13.0
|-
| 
| 64 || 5 || 21.2 || .434 || .390 || .777 || 2.4 || 1.4 || .8 || .1 || 10.1
|-
| 
| 65 || 2 || 12.5 || .398 || .250 || .808 || 2.7 || 1.0 || .4 || .1 || 3.0
|}

See also
2006–07 NBA season

References

New York Knicks seasons
New York Knicks
New York Knicks
New York Knick
2000s in Manhattan
Madison Square Garden